The following is a list of unproduced Joss Whedon projects in roughly chronological order. During his long career, American film director Joss Whedon has worked on a number of projects which never progressed beyond the pre-production stage under his direction. Some of these projects are officially cancelled or fell into development hell.

Many of Whedon's unrealized projects were cancelled spin-offs of Whedon's hit show Buffy the Vampire Slayer, so to see a complete list of these, go to Undeveloped Buffy the Vampire Slayer spinoffs.

1990s

Suspension 
On June 25, 1993, Variety reported that Whedon had sold to Largo Entertainment a spec script entitled Suspension for $750,000, with and additional $250,000 if production had commenced. The film was to be based on the premise of terrorists seizing control of New York City's George Washington Bridge during a traffic jam. However, the script was never produced, along Afterlife. On September 19, 2014, Empire reported that the script was being made, and that Liam Neeson is attached to star in the lead role.

Afterlife 
In 1994, Whedon sold to Sony Pictures Entertainment a spec script entitled Afterlife for $1.5 million, with an additional $500,000 if production had commenced. On March 13, 2000, Variety reported that Andy Tennant was in talks to direct and write the film. The film's plot was about Daniel Hoffstetter, a government scientist, who awakes after dying to discover his mind has been imprinted on a mind-wiped body of a serial killer called Snowman. Despite this, the project never progressed after that announcement, implying that it was scrapped or abandoned. However, some themes and ideas of the script were later used in Whedon's TV show Dollhouse, which was released in 2009.

2000s

Batman: Year One 
Around 2001, Whedon was hired as writer for Darren Aronofsky's and Frank Miller's Batman: Year One after The Wachowskis' script was rejected by Warner Bros. Whedon's script featured a new, "more of a 'Hannibal Lecter' type" villain, and portrayed Bruce Wayne as "a morbid, death-obsessed kid" whose grief was overcome by protecting a girl from being bullied in an alley similar to where his parents were murdered. However, like The Wachowskis' script, Whedon's script was also rejected, and both Aronofsky and Miller left the project, leading to its cancellation. A reboot of the Batman film series was later released in 2005 as Batman Begins and directed by Christopher Nolan.

Buffy the Animated Series 
In 2001, Whedon and 20th Century Fox started the development of Buffy the Animated Series, an animated spin-off of Whedon's popular TV show Buffy the Vampire Slayer. Whedon and Jeph Loeb were to produce the show while many actor of the original series were attached to reprise their roles. It was initially planned to be aired in Fox Kids, possibly as early in February 2002. However, Fox Kids ceased its operations in September 2002, and no network wanted to pick up the series, which resulted in the abandonment of this project.

Ripper 
In 2001, Whedon planned to make an spin-off miniseries or TV movie of Buffy the Vampire Slayer entitled Ripper, about the character Rupert Giles. Despite this, the project was delayed. On July 28, 2007, Whedon revealed via IGN that a 90 minute Ripper special would be made in 2008. Anthony Head was slated to reprise his role as Rupert Giles. However, at the end, no movie or series was made and the project was abandoned. Despite this, some elements of the cancelled project were later used in the comic book series Angel & Faith.

Alien 5 
Before Alien Resurrection had even been released in theaters, a Fox executive said about a possible Alien 5: "Joss Whedon will write it, and we expect to have Sigourney and Winona if they're up for it." At the same time, Joss Whedon said "There's a big story to tell in another sequel... The fourth film is really a prologue to a movie set on Earth. Imagine all the things that can happen.... If I write this movie, and it has my writing credits on it, then it's going to be on Earth". However, he lost interest after seeing how Alien Resurrection turned out, saying "I'll tell you there was a time when I would have been interested in that, but I am not interested in making somebody else's franchise anymore. Any movie I make will be created by me". Sigourney Weaver, unaware of Whedon's change of heart, would go on to claim that he had in fact written a script. Whedon later joked about being surprised to find that he had written such a script.

Spike 
In 2004, Joss Whedon set plans for a Spike movie. The film, if ever greenlit, would star James Marsters, Alyson Hannigan and Amy Acker. At a convention, Acker stated the film was not going ahead due to money issues.

Goners 
After the release of Serenity in 2005, Whedon sold a spec script entitled Goners to Universal Pictures. Whedon was attached to write and direct the film, while Mary Parent and Scott Stuber were attached to produce it. During an interview with Fanboy Radio in 2006, Whedon spoke about the film: "I've been seeing a lot of horror movies that are torture-porn, where kids we don't care about are mutilated for hours, and I just cannot abide them... it's an antidote to that very kind of film, the horror movie with the expendable human beings in it. Because I don't believe any human beings are". The film's plot was described as a mystical fantasy thriller with a female lead named Mia. The project never materialized; however, some of its themes were reused for The Cabin in the Woods which Whedon cowrote with Drew Goddard.

Wonder Woman 
On March 17, 2005, Warner Bros. reported that Whedon was hired to write and direct the long time planned Wonder Woman feature film, while Joel Silver was attached to produce it. The film's plot was to focus on Wonder Woman's adventures during World War II. However, on February 2, 2007, MTV reported that Whedon was no longer attached to the project, leading to its cancellation. Whedon said "We just saw different movies, and at the price range this kind of movie hangs in, that's never gonna work. Non-sympatico. It happens all the time".

Dr. Horrible 2 
On May 11, 2009, Nathan Fillion revealed during an interview that Whedon was planning a sequel of his acclaimed miniseries Dr. Horrible's Sing-Along Blog. Whedon expressed his interest in make the sequel as another miniseries or as a feature film. On March 15, 2012, it was reported that the script would be written that summer and that the principal photography was to take place in 2013. However, the production was delayed and apparently abandoned due to Whedon's commitments with Marvel Studios.

2010s

Wastelanders 
On September 23, 2011, it was reported that Whedon had worked with comic book author Warren Ellis to make a webseries entitled Wastelanders, which was an "end-of-the-world" project. However, it was also announced that its production was postponed and apparently cancelled due to Whedon's concerns with The Avengers.

Batgirl 
In March 2017, Whedon was in negotiations to direct, write, and produce Batgirl set in the DC Extended Universe. After a year of developing it, he withdrew from the project in February 2018, stating that he couldn't come up with a working story for the movie.

Pippa Smith: Grown-Up Detective 
In December 2020, TheWrap reported that Freeform decided not to move forward with the dark comedy series "Pippa Smith: Grown-Up Detective" from executive producer Joss Whedon. The show had been in development at the Disney-owned cable channel since June 2018.

References 

Whedon, Joss
Unrealized